Jaymz Bee (born April 13, 1963) is a Canadian musician, writer, emcee and radio personality based in Toronto, Ontario.

Early life
Jaymz was raised in North Bay, Ontario. He was a founder of the Al Waxman Fan Club at Inglenook Community High School and of the punk band Bee People. "Bee had a fixation on [Waxman]... '[W]e only dressed in black and yellow and we only sang songs about Al Waxman: about his dog, his movies, his life, anything we could think of. We ended up with an hour-long show, just about Al Waxman.'"

Early career
In 1985 Bee and his drummer Bob Scott joined members of a defunct Swiss band to form the alternative rock band Look People and left for Switzerland. "'[W]e were a weird band that shouldn’t even be able to sell a record, and we were getting huge tours opening for Los Lobos or Bob Geldof or Wishbone Ash or Uriah Heep in stadiums.'" After three years he and Scott returned to Toronto. The duo recruited new members and continued to perform as Look People until April 1994.

In 1988 Bee performed on the Carlos Perón album Impersonator II. In 1992 Bee became the musical director for Friday Night with Ralph Benmergui when Look People became its house band.

Bee returned home to Toronto and began working on a jazz (lounge) arrangements with Jono Grant, a childhood friend and multi-instrumentalist. After recording a three-song demo they were asked to perform at Ontario Place as part of Molly Johnson's AIDS benefit "Kumbaya", which was broadcast across Canada on Much Music.

In 1994 Bee and Melleny Melody formed an independent label called "Nepotism Records". 

Bee formed "Jaymz Bee and the Royal Jelly Orchestra" and recorded the group's first lounge music album in 1995.

Bee worked at BMG Music Canada, running a boutique label called "Leisure Lab". He released a CD for Calgary crooner Tim Tamashiro, and three more albums for the Royal Jelly Orchestra.

Recent career
In 1997, Bee published the book Cocktail Parties for Dummies, and began hosting radio shows on Toronto's CFRB and CFMJ.  In 2002, he released a new album, produced by Dave Howard, Sub Urban by Jaymz Bee and the Deep Lounge Coalition and followed that with another Royal Jelly Orchestra release entitled Seriously Happy for Wychwood Productions. His last recording with the RJO was Toronto Launch Pad, recorded in 2006 for his own label, Timely Manor.

In 2004 Bee began hosting radio programs on CJRT. In 2005 he produced a concert, "Jazz Lives", at Convocation Hall, to raise money for the not-for-profit radio station; this has become an annual event. Bee also hosted tours of Toronto clubs for donors, and organizes international excursions to jazz capitals, including New York, Havana, New Orleans, San Francisco, Chicago, London, Perugia, and Reykjavik.

 For over a decade Jaymz ran a PR firm called Bullhorn which turned into a personal monthly newsletter in 2016. Bee formed a pop group called Bonzai Suzuki with Dave Howard. Their self-titled debut was released in the summer of 2011 and their follow up recording called "Everything Leads To Everything Else". He also collaborated with Carlos Peron (ex member of the band Yello) on an electronic dance recording called "Tuk" and most recently (2017) began writing and recording The Tiki Collective - a surf jazz band led by guitarist Eric St-Laurent. In 2018 this group released their debut album Muse, which reached #17 on the Canadian campus radio jazz chart in December. His publishing company "Happy Fingers Music" continues to record for a number of jazz and pop artists.  

In 2020 Bee released three albums (along with his partner Lorenzo Digianfelice) on his Vesuvius Music Inc. record label included John Finley's "Soul Singer" produced and arranged by Lou Pomanti - and The Tiki Collective albums "Anthology" and "Muse Re-Visited".

In 2021, it was revealed that a documentary about Bee's life (working title: Being Bee) is currently being produced. Collaborators on the project include the team at Retrontario and Joel Goldberg, notable for his work on Electric Circus and directing music videos for Maestro (rapper).

External links

References

Canadian radio personalities
Canadian rock singers
Musicians from Toronto
People from North Bay, Ontario
Living people
Jazz radio presenters
1963 births